The Premiere Collection Encore is a 1992 compilation album by Andrew Lloyd Webber. The album acted as a follow-up to The Premiere Collection: The Best of Andrew Lloyd Webber. In the four intervening years, the original London production of Aspects of Love and Lloyd Webber's new production of Joseph and the Amazing Technicolor Dreamcoat had both opened; therefore a number of tracks were included from those shows.

A video compilation with the same title, but including songs from both albums, was released the same year on VHS and CD-i, and in 1993 on LaserDisc.

The songs' lyricists include Tim Rice, Don Black, Richard Stilgoe, Charles Hart and Trevor Nunn.

Track listing
 "Amigos Para Siempre (Friends for Life)" - José Carreras and Sarah Brightman (Official theme of the Barcelona 1992 Games)
 "Love Changes Everything" - Michael Ball (from Aspects of Love)
 "Memory" - Barbra Streisand (from Cats)
 "I Am the Starlight" - Lon Satton and Ray Shell (from Starlight Express)
 "Wishing You Were Somehow Here Again" - Sarah Brightman (from The Phantom of the Opera)
 "Argentine Melody" - San José featuring Rodriguez Argentina (1978 official BBC TV World Cup theme)
 "Oh What a Circus" - David Essex (from Evita)
 "Seeing Is Believing" - Michael Ball and Ann Crumb (from Aspects of Love)
 "The Jellicle Ball" - The Royal Philharmonic Orchestra (from Cats/1982 World Cup Grandstand theme)
 "Any Dream Will Do" - Jason Donovan (from Joseph and the Amazing Technicolor Dreamcoat)
 "Everything's Alright" - Sarah Brightman (from Jesus Christ Superstar)
 "Close Every Door" - Phillip Schofield (from Joseph and the Amazing Technicolor Dreamcoat)
 "The First Man You Remember" - Michael Ball and Diana Morrison (from Aspects of Love)
 "Anything But Lonely" - Sarah Brightman (from Aspects of Love)
 "The Point of No Return" - Michael Crawford and Sarah Brightman (from The Phantom of the Opera)
 "Hosanna" - Plácido Domingo (from Requiem)

Video 

"The Phantom of the Opera" - Sarah Brightman and Steve Harley (from The Phantom of the Opera)
"The Music of the Night" - Michael Crawford (from The Phantom of the Opera)
"All I Ask of You" - Cliff Richard and Sarah Brightman (from The Phantom of the Opera)
"Tell Me on a Sunday" - Sarah Brightman (from Tell Me on a Sunday)
"Pie Jesu" - Sarah Brightman and Paul Miles Kingston with the Winchester Cathedral Choir (from Requiem)
"Amigos Para Siempre (Friends for Life)" - José Carreras and Sarah Brightman (Official theme of the Barcelona 1992 Games)
 "Love Changes Everything" - Michael Ball (from Aspects of Love)
 "Wishing You Were Somehow Here Again" - Sarah Brightman (from The Phantom of the Opera)
 "Oh What a Circus" (Live) - David Essex (from Evita)
 "Any Dream Will Do" - Jason Donovan (from Joseph and the Amazing Technicolor Dreamcoat)
 "Close Every Door" - Phillip Schofield (from Joseph and the Amazing Technicolor Dreamcoat)
 "The First Man You Remember" - Michael Ball and Diana Morrison (from Aspects of Love)
 "Anything But Lonely" - Sarah Brightman (from Aspects of Love)
 "Joseph Mega-Remix" - Jason Donovan and Cast (from Joseph and the Amazing Technicolor Dreamcoat)

Personnel 

Sarah Brightman – vocals
Julie Covington – vocals
Michael Crawford – vocals
Barbara Dickson – vocals
Yvonne Elliman – vocals
Steven Hall – mastering
Steve Harley – vocals
Murray Head – vocals
JL – Artwork, design
Julian Lloyd Webber – cello
Paul Miles-Kingston – vocals
Paul Nicholas – vocals
Carlos Olms – engineer, digital engineer
Elaine Paige – vocals
Cliff Richard – vocals
Ray Shell – vocals
Marti Webb – vocals

References

Andrew Lloyd Webber albums
1992 compilation albums
Albums produced by Andrew Lloyd Webber
Albums produced by Nigel Wright